The 2019–20 Maine Black Bears Men's ice hockey season was the 45th season of play for the program, the 43rd season competing at the Division I level, and the 36th season in the Hockey East conference. The Black Bears represented the University of Maine and played their home games at Alfond Arena, and were coached by Red Gendron, in his 7th season as their head coach.

Personnel

Head Coach: Red Gendron, 7th season

Assistant Coach: Ben Guite, 7th season

Assistant Coach: Alfie Michaud, 4th season

Volunteer Assistant Coach: Scott Hillman

Roster

As of November 12, 2019.

Standings

Schedule and Results

|-
!colspan=12 style=";" | Regular Season

|-
!colspan=12 style=";" | Hockey East Tournament

Scoring Statistics

Goaltending statistics

Rankings

References

Maine Black Bears men's ice hockey seasons
Maine Black Bears
Maine Black Bears
2019 in sports in Maine
2020 in sports in Maine